The Elton B. Stephens Expressway, more commonly referred to locally as the Red Mountain Expressway, is a limited-access freeway serving as a north–south connection between Homewood and Mountain Brook south of Red Mountain with I-20/I-59 just to the northeast of downtown Birmingham. It was named for local businessman and philanthropist Elton Bryson Stephens, Sr., who chaired the Birmingham and Jefferson County Freeway and Expressway Committee. The expressway was largely built over the former path of 26th Street North and South. It runs through the Red Mountain Expressway Cut, designated a National Historic Landmark in 1987.

The freeway generally carries three lanes for travel in each direction and carries traffic for both U.S. Route 31 (US 31) and US 280. From its southern terminus to University Boulevard, the freeway is mostly at-grade. Between University Boulevard and its northern terminus, the freeway is elevated.

Route description

History

Construction commenced in 1962 with the initial blasting of the Red Mountain Expressway Cut and construction of the interchange with Florida Short Route. The latter work was delayed by intransigence from the Jefferson County Board of Education, which denied crews access to the Shades Valley High School campus until the Alabama Department of Transportation secured replacement land for that condemned for highway use.

The Highland Avenue overpass was completed in January 1967. The cut was completed later that same year, with the highway opening in 1970.

Originally ending at 2nd Avenue North, its connection with I-20/I-59 and Carraway Boulevard was completed in the 1980s over the site of Birmingham’s grand Terminal Station demolished in 1969.

When the expressway was originally constructed, a cloverleaf exit was constructed at 1st Avenue North for southbound traffic. An on-ramp was constructed over the cloverleaf and used in the 1970s, but later removed. Currently, although the cloverleaf exit exists, it is closed to traffic.

In the months leading to 1996 Olympics soccer to be hosted in Legion Field, the Olympic soccer countdown clock was located on the Highland Avenue overpass.

In 2020 a countdown clock was placed in the same position counting down to the 2021 World Games to be hosted in Birmingham. When the 2020 Tokyo Olympics were delayed due to Covid-19, the World Games were delayed until 2022 and the 365 days added to the clock.

Exit list

.

See also

References

External links

Roads in Alabama
Transportation in Jefferson County, Alabama
Expressways in the United States
Transportation in Birmingham, Alabama
U.S. Route 31
Stephens family